The 1988 Nabisco Masters was a men's tennis tournament played on indoor carpet courts in Madison Square Garden, New York City in the United States between 28 November and 2 December 1988.  Whilst the doubles event was held at the Royal Albert Hall, London, Great Britain. It was the year-end championship of the 1988 Nabisco Grand Prix.

Finals

Singles

 Boris Becker defeated  Ivan Lendl, 5–7, 7–6(7–5), 3–6, 6–2, 7–6(7–5).

Doubles

 Rick Leach /  Jim Pugh defeated  Sergio Casal /  Emilio Sánchez 6–4, 6–3, 2–6, 6–0.

See also
 1988 Virginia Slims Championships

References